Tom Perko (June 17, 1954 – February 2, 1980) was a former American football linebacker who played in the National Football League. He graduated from Steubenville Catholic Central High School in 1972, was a member of the school's 1971 state championship team, and was drafted by the Green Bay Packers in the fourth round of the 1976 NFL Draft and played that season with the team. He was killed in a car accident in February 2, 1980.

References

1954 births
1980 deaths
Sportspeople from Steubenville, Ohio
Players of American football from Ohio
Green Bay Packers players
American football linebackers
Pittsburgh Panthers football players
Road incident deaths in Pennsylvania